Bayqara Kuh (Azerbaijani: Dağ Bayqara or داغ بایقارا; also Romanized as Bāyqarā’ Kūh; also known as Bai Qara, Bāyqarā’, and Bay Qareh) is a village in Qaranqu Rural District, in the Central District of Hashtrud County, East Azerbaijan Province, Iran. At the 2006 census, its population was 177, in 40 families.

References 

Towns and villages in Hashtrud County